Join Us is the fifteenth studio album from the rock band They Might Be Giants, released on July 19, 2011. It is the band's first adult album in four years since The Else in 2007. Following the success of their 2009 children's album, Here Comes Science, the band returned to their adult audience with Join Us, an eclectic collection of 18 songs.

In an interview with The A.V. Club, Flansburgh commented, "We probably recorded 30 songs for this album, and the songs that are on album are basically the last 15 or so. There were so many strange misfires at the beginning, just the most mutant songs." Some of the songs that were left off Join Us were later completed and released on the rarities compilation Album Raises New And Troubling Questions.

Background
Recording began in March 2009, according to a July 2009 interview with Billboard, wherein John Flansburgh also mentioned that eight songs had already been recorded. An incomplete track listing composed of fourteen songs was revealed on Pitchfork.com on April 5, 2011. The track list was updated to include four more songs ("Canajoharie," "Celebration," "Dog Walker," and "Spoiler Alert") on the band's Facebook page on April 26.

Reception

Join Us has garnered fairly positive reviews from critics. It debuted at No. 32 on the Billboard 200 Albums chart and No. 8 on both the Billboard Rock Albums and Billboard Alternative Albums charts. Join Us also debuted at No. 8 on both the Billboard Rock and Billboard Alternative charts. It disappeared from the charts the following week. Join Us appeared at No. 20 on the CMJ Radio 200 on July 25, 2011. It climbed to No. 11 on August 2 and continued its ascension, reaching No. 5 on August 23. It spent 20 weeks on that chart.

Two de facto singles emerged: "Can't Keep Johnny Down", which was released as a free MP3 on Pitchfork's website on April 5, as well as a promotional CD, and "You Probably Get That A Lot", which was promotionally issued in the UK. Music videos were produced for both songs, the former starring Rip Torn, although both tracks failed to chart. Music videos featuring the band were also produced for "Spoiler Alert" and "Cloisonné". The music video for "When Will You Die", which featured the construction of a life-size monster hearse by the Office of Paul Sahre, went viral and achieved over 100,000 views total—more than 25,000 in just one month. The artwork for Join Us was also very well-received, and Sahre was nominated for a 2012 Design of the Year Award from the Design Museum.

Track listing

Personnel
They Might Be Giants
 John Linnell – lead vocals, backup vocals, keyboards, bass clarinet, accordion, saxophones, programming
 John Flansburgh – lead vocals, backup vocals, guitar, programming
 Dan Miller – lead guitar, keyboards
 Danny Weinkauf – bass, keyboards
 Marty Beller – drums, percussion

Additional musicians
 Stan Harrison – horn arrangement on track 5; saxophones on tracks 5, 9 and 17; bass flute on track 14
 Curt Ramm – trumpet on tracks 8, 9, 10, 13 and 17
 Dan Levine – trombone on tracks 9, 13 and 17
 Mauro Refosco – percussion on tracks 13 and 15
 David Driver – lead vocal on track 17
 Michael Cerveris – lead vocal on track 17

Production
 Pat Dillett – producer, engineer
 Jon Altschuler – engineer
 Greg Thompson – engineer
 UE Nastasi – mastering
 Paul Sahre – cover art

Chart performance

References

External links
 
 Join Us article on This Might Be a Wiki

2011 albums
They Might Be Giants albums
Rounder Records albums
Idlewild Recordings albums
Albums produced by Pat Dillett